Aroosa is a 1994 Pakistani television series that aired on PTV written by Fatima Surayya Bajia based on the novel Aroosa which was written by Zubaida Khatoon and directed by Qasim Jalali. It was the debut serial of Adnan Siddiqui and Mishi Khan.

Synopsis 
The (Shakeel) father is a barrister and shares a close bond with his younger (Neelofar) and (Ishrat) older sisters but neglects his wife. His second marriage with a refined, educated woman creates complications as his sisters find her hard to tolerate. The father divorces (Ghazala) Anjum when Uroosa is just a baby.

Cast 
 Ghazala Kaifee as Anjum (Uroosa's mother)
 Shakeel as Tofique (Uroosa's father)
 Mishi Khan as Uroosa (Anjum and Tofique's daughter)
 Adnan Siddiqui as Shehryar (Uroosa's husband)
 Neelofar Abbasi as Choti Aapa (Tofique's younger sister)
 Ishrat Hashmi as Naeema (Tofique's older sister)
 Rizwan Wasti as Rafi
 Sultana Zafar as Atiya (Uroosa's aunt)
 Mazhar Ali as Aftab
 Zaheen Tahira as Khala Jee
 Humayun Mehboob as Munir
 Ayesha Khan as Shireen
 Shama Junejo as Arifa
 Zafar Ali as Zawar

Production

Casting 
The lead role of Shehryar was offered to Aijaz Aslam but he refused due to his studies and then the role was given to Adnan Siddiqui. It was the second on-screen appearance of Ghazala and Shakeel after drama Ana.

References

External links
 

1990s Pakistani television series
Pakistani television dramas based on novels
Pakistan Television Corporation original programming
Pakistani drama television series
Pakistani family television dramas
Urdu-language television shows